Paweł Herczyński is a Polish diplomat and the EU ambassador to Georgia since September 2022. Before his appointment to Georgia Herczyński was the European External Action Service (EEAS) Managing Director for the Common Security and Defence Policy (CSDP) and Crisis Response, and also served as Director for Security and Defence Policy at the EEAS. Prior to that, he was Polish ambassador to the EU Political and Security Committee (PSC).

Herczyński held several senior positions within the Polish Foreign Ministry, including Deputy Permanent Representative to the UN, Deputy Director of the EU Department – European Correspondent, and Deputy Representative of Poland to NATO Political Committee in Brussels.

Paweł Herczyński speaks his native Polish, and also English, Spanish, German, French, and Russian.

References

Ambassadors of the European Union to Georgia (country)
Polish diplomats
Ambassadors of Poland
Year of birth missing (living people)
Living people